Geldersheim is a municipality in the lower franconian district of Schweinfurt in Bavaria, Germany. Its name roughly translates to "money home".

References

Schweinfurt (district)